Mark Andrew Machtolf (born October 31, 1964) is an American college baseball coach, the head coach of the Gonzaga Bulldogs of the West Coast Conference.  He succeeded Steve Hertz, who retired after the 2003 season, after 23 years at the helm. Machtolf was an assistant to Hertz for the previous eight seasons  Under Machtolf, Gonzaga has made three NCAA Tournament appearances (2009, 2016, 2018).  As a result of Gonzaga's successful season in 2009, Machtolf was named the WCC Coach of the Year.

Machtolf graduated from Gonzaga Prep in 1983 and Stanford University in 1987. A three-sport star in high school, he played college baseball for the Stanford Cardinal from 1984–1987.  In his senior season of 1987, the Cardinal won the national title and he was named to the All-College World Series Team as a designated hitter.  He also played college football at Stanford in 1983 and 1984.

Head coaching record
Below is a table of Machtolf's yearly records as an NCAA head baseball coach.

See also
List of current NCAA Division I baseball coaches

References

External links
Gonzaga University Athletics – Mark Machtolf
Gonzaga Bulldogs Baseball – record book (2018)

Living people
1964 births
Gonzaga Preparatory School alumni
Stanford Cardinal baseball players
Stanford Cardinal football players
Whitworth Pirates baseball coaches
Gonzaga Bulldogs baseball coaches
Baseball players from Spokane, Washington
Players of American football from Spokane, Washington
Baseball coaches from Washington (state)
Whitworth University alumni